Rainbow was a J-class yacht built in 1930, and successful defender of the 1934 America's Cup. It was ordered by Harold Vanderbilt and designed by William Starling Burgess. Rainbow was scrapped in 1940.

Replica
A replica, Rainbow, was launched in 2012 at Holland Jachtbouw. In January 2015 it was reported that she was for sale with an asking price of €10,450,000 VAT paid.

References

J-class yachts
America's Cup defenders
Sailing yachts built in the United States
Sailing yachts built in the Netherlands
Sailing yachts designed by William Starling Burgess
1930s sailing yachts